Laleli is a village of the Refahiye district of Erzincan Province in the Eastern Anatolia region of Turkey. It was previously attached to the district of Kemah.

Name
The word "lale" means "tulip" in Turkish. The suffix "-li" has various meanings, including "with", "has", and "by". Accordingly, the word "Laleli" could be translated into English as "full of tulips".

References 

Villages in Refahiye District